The U.S. House Subcommittee on the Indo-Pacific is a subcommittee within the House Foreign Affairs Committee. Before the 118th Congress, it was most recently known as the Subcommittee on Asia, the Pacific, Central Asia and Nonproliferation.

Jurisdiction
The subcommittee is one of five with what the committees calls "regional jurisdiction" over a specific area of the globe. Such jurisdiction includes political relations between the United States and countries in the region and related legislation, disaster assistance, boundary issues, and international claims. The regional subcommittees also oversee the activities of the United Nations and its programs in the region.

Members, 118th Congress

Historical membership rosters

115th Congress

116th Congress

117th Congress

References

External links
 Subcommittee page

Foreign Affairs House Asia and the Pacific